Hanover Township, Ohio, may refer to:
Hanover Township, Ashland County, Ohio
Hanover Township, Butler County, Ohio
Hanover Township, Columbiana County, Ohio
Hanover Township, Licking County, Ohio

Ohio township disambiguation pages